The Watchung Borough Schools are a comprehensive community public school district, serving students in pre-kindergarten through eighth grade from Watchung, in Somerset County, New Jersey, United States.

As of the 2019–20 school year, the district, comprised of two schools, had an enrollment of 604 students and 66.6 classroom teachers (on an FTE basis), for a student–teacher ratio of 9.1:1.

The district is classified by the New Jersey Department of Education as being in District Factor Group "I", the second-highest of eight groupings. District Factor Groups organize districts statewide to allow comparison by common socioeconomic characteristics of the local districts. From lowest socioeconomic status to highest, the categories are A, B, CD, DE, FG, GH, I and J.

Watchung's students in public school for ninth through twelfth grades attend Watchung Hills Regional High School in Warren Township together with students from the neighboring communities of Green Brook Township and Warren Township (in Somerset County) and Long Hill Township (in Morris County). As of the 2019–20 school year, the high school had an enrollment of 1,948 students and 160.6 classroom teachers (on an FTE basis), for a student–teacher ratio of 12.1:1.

Schools
Schools in the district (with 2019–20 enrollment data from the National Center for Education Statistics) are:
Elementary school
Bayberry Elementary School with 326 students in grades PreK – 4
Denise Fichner, Principal
Middle school
Valley View School with 271 students in grades 5 – 8
Karin Kidd, Principal

Administration
Core members of the district's administration are:
George P. Alexis, Superintendent
Richard Pepe, Business Administrator

Board of education
The district's board of education is comprised of nine members, who set policy and oversee the fiscal and educational operation of the district through its administration. As a Type II school district, the board's trustees are elected directly by voters to serve three-year terms of office on a staggered basis, with three seats up for election each year held (since 2012) as part of the November general election. The board appoints a superintendent to oversee the day-to-day operation of the district.

References

External links
Watchung Borough Schools

Watchung Borough Schools, National Center for Education Statistics
Watchung Hills Regional High School website

Watchung, New Jersey
New Jersey District Factor Group I
School districts in Somerset County, New Jersey